Chionodiptera is a genus of moths in the family Lasiocampidae. The genus was erected by Yves de Lajonquière in 1972.

Species
Chionodiptera nivea de Lajonquière, 1972
Chionodiptera virginalis Viette, 1962

External links

Lasiocampidae